Yünbüken (also known as Germisik) is a village in the Çemişgezek District, Tunceli Province, Turkey. The village had a population of 52 in 2021.

The hamlet of İncesu is attached to the village.

References 

Villages in Çemişgezek District